Vira bruk is a village and an historic iron works in Österåker in Sweden.

Vira bruk was founded around 1630 by Clas Fleming. On the basis on a monopoly granted by a royal privilege it manufactured most of the rapiers and swords for the Swedish army into the mid 19th Century.

Vira bruk was owned by the Fleming family until 1757, when it was sold to Reinhold Angerstein, who at that time was an official of the Swedish Board of Mines. Angerstein planned for extension of the manufacturing, but died in 1760 before they could be realized. The works then were taken over by his brother-in-law, the archbishop Samuel Troilius.

The royal privilege lasted until 1775, but the forge continued to supply weapons to the Swedish armed forces into the 19th Century and later manufactured civilian products, such as axes and scythes, into the mid-20th Century. Vira bruk is now a museum.

References
Alf Nordström: Vira klingsmedja och liebruk, Stiftelsen Stockholms läns museum and Stiftelsen Vira Bruk, Uddevalla 1985

Defunct companies of Sweden
Weapon history